Wan Haifeng (born September 25, 1920) is a retired Chinese military officer. He was awarded the military rank of general (Shangjiang) in September 1988.

Born in Guangshan County, Henan, Wan joined the Red Army at the age of only 13 and joined the Chinese Communist Party at the age of 17. He fought in the Second Sino-Japanese War, the Chinese Civil War and the Korea War.

He was a member of the 12th Central Committee of the Chinese Communist Party a member of the Central Advisory Commission. He was delegate to the 13th National Congress of the Chinese Communist Party. He was a deputy to the 5th and 7th National People's Congress.

Biography
Wan was born Maotou into a family of farming background in September 1920 in Guangshan County, Henan, the third child of Wan Tianrun and Mrs. Xiao. He has two elder sisters. His mother died when he was 3.

During the Agrarian Revolutionary War (1927), he was a squad leader in the 28th Army. He participated in the Hubei-Henan-Anhui Guerrilla Warfare.

In July 1933, he joined the Red Army. His superior Gao Jingting named him Wan Haifeng. And he enlisted in the Communist Youth League of China in 1935. He joined the Chinese Communist Party in October 1937.

In 1949, he participated in the Battle of Menglianggu, the Huaihai Campaign and the Yangtze River Crossing Campaign led by Liu Bocheng and Deng Xiaoping in eastern China.

In 1952, after the outbreak of the Korea War, the Chinese government commissioned him as a deputy division commander of the Chinese People's Volunteers. He returned to China and was awarded the military rank of senior colonel in 1955.

In 1955, Wan entered the PLA National Defence University, where he graduated in 1959. After graduation, he was appointed as division commander of PLA Ground Force. In May 1972 he was promoted to become deputy commander of Beijing Military Region, and held that office until October 1975, when he was appointed deputy political commissar and a Party standing committee member. He commanded soldiers to take part in the relief work of the Tangshan Earthquake. He became political commissar of Chengdu Military Region in October 1982, a position he held until April 1990. He attained the rank of general (Shangjiang) in September 1988. He retired in September 1998.

On September 2, 2015, he was hired as the honorary president of Red Army School in Yichang, Hubei.

Personal life
Wan met Zhao Zheng in early 1943, when she was a surgeon. Their wedding ceremony was held in October that same year. The couple have four children.

Zhao Zeng died on September 16, 2019, aged 96.

Awards
 Order of Bayi, 3rd Class
 Order of Independence and Freedom, 2nd Class
 Order of Liberation, 2nd Class
 Honor Merit Medal of Red Star, 2nd

References

1920 births
Living people
PLA National Defence University alumni
Chinese military personnel of World War II
People's Liberation Army generals from Henan
Beijing Military Region
Chengdu Military Region
Chinese centenarians
Men centenarians